Deh Tuk (also Romanized as Deh Tūk; also known as Deh Tūg) is a village in Rahdar Rural District, in the Central District of Rudan County, Hormozgan Province, Iran. At the 2006 census, its population was 22, in 7 families.

References 

Populated places in Rudan County